Phractura bovei is a species of catfish that lives in the Lower Congo River. It lives in a freshwater habitat. Its total length is 11 cm.

References

bovei
Freshwater fish of Central Africa
Congo drainage basin
Fish described in 1892
Endemic fauna of the Democratic Republic of the Congo
Taxa named by Alberto Perugia